The Battle of Sellnitz was fought on 23 September 1438 between the Imperial Saxons and the Hussites. The Saxons were led by Frederick II of Saxony. On his journey to Saxony from Bohemia was accompanied by czech noble Jakoubek of Vřesovice, the former hussite leader (hetman) of the Union of Žatec and Louny, now hetman of the region Litoměřice and Žatec. During their journey they clashed with the hussite army of the Union of Žatec and Louny led by several nobles strengthened by 300 Polish cavalrymen. Jakoubek tried to negotiate with his former companions, but failed. The Saxons won the battle; about 2,000 Hussites were killed, and again as many taken prisoner.

References

Bibliography
 Ludwig Schlesinger, The battle at Sellnitz (1438). Narrative of the Association for the History of Germans in Bohemia, Vol 20 (1882), pages 1-61

1438 in Europe
Sellnitz 1438
Sellnitz 1438
Battles in Bohemia
History of the Ústí nad Labem Region